Knut Stenborg (25 March 1890, in Hjo – 10 October 1946, in Vänersborg) was a Swedish athlete. He competed in the 1908 Summer Olympics in London and in the 1912 Summer Olympics in Stockholm.

In the 100 metres, Stenborg placed second in his first round heat with a time of 11.5 seconds. His loss to Robert Duncan eliminated Stenborg from competition.

Stenborg placed fourth and last in his preliminary heat of the 200 metres, not advancing to the semifinals in that event either.

Four years later he was eliminated in the first round of the 200 metres competition. In the 400 metres event he was eliminated in the semi-finals. He was also a member of the Swedish relay team which was eliminated in the first round of the 4x400 metre relay contest.

References

Sources
 
 
 

1890 births
1946 deaths
Swedish male sprinters
Olympic athletes of Sweden
Athletes (track and field) at the 1908 Summer Olympics
Athletes (track and field) at the 1912 Summer Olympics
People from Hjo Municipality
Sportspeople from Västra Götaland County